John Blaquiere, 1st Baron de Blaquiere, KCB, PC (15 May 1732 – 27 August 1812), known as Sir John Blaquiere, Bt. from 1784 to 1800, was a British soldier, diplomat and politician of French descent. He served as Chief Secretary for Ireland between 1772 and 1776

Background
Blaquiere was the fifth son of Jean de Blaquiere, a French merchant who had emigrated to England in 1685, and his wife Marie Elizabeth de Varennes.

Career
Blaquiere at first served in the British Army, in the 18th Dragoons (later renumbered the 17th Dragoons), where he achieved the rank of lieutenant-colonel. In 1771 Blaquiere was appointed Secretary of Legation at the British Embassy in Paris, a post he held until 1772. The latter year Lord Harcourt, the British Ambassador in Paris, was appointed Lord Lieutenant of Ireland, and Blaquiere joined him as Chief Secretary for Ireland. He was admitted to the Privy Council of Ireland the same year and made a Knight Companion of the Order of the Bath two years later. He was awarded an honorary LLD from Trinity College Dublin in 1773.

Blaquiere was to remain Chief Secretary until 6 December 1776. He had been elected to the Irish House of Commons for Old Leighlin in 1773, a seat he held until 1783. After representing Enniskillen for a few months in 1783, he sat than for Carlingford from 1783 to 1790, for Charleville from 1790 to 1798 and for Newtownards from 1798 to the Act of Union in 1801. Blaquiere was created a Baronet, of Ardkill in the County of Londonderry, on 16 July 1784, and raised to the Peerage of Ireland as Baron de Blaquiere, of Ardkill in the County of Londonderry, on 30 July 1800, for his support for the Act of Union. Lord de Blaquiere also sat as a Member of the British House of Commons for Rye from 1801 to 1802 and for Downton from 1802 to 1806.

He was elected a Fellow of the Royal Society in 1803.

Family
Lord de Blaquiere married Eleanor, daughter of Robert Dobson, in 1775. They had four sons, including Peter de Blaquière, and three daughters. Lord de Blaquiere died at Bray, County Wicklow, in August 1812, aged 80. He was succeeded in his titles by his eldest son, John. Lady de Blaquiere died at Regent's Park, Marylebone, London, in December 1833.

References

External links 
 
  

1732 births
1812 deaths
19th-century Irish people
Politicians from County Wicklow
17th Lancers officers
Barons in the Peerage of Ireland
Peers of Ireland created by George III
English people of French descent
Irish MPs 1769–1776
Irish MPs 1776–1783
Irish MPs 1783–1790
Irish MPs 1790–1797
Irish MPs 1798–1800
Knights Companion of the Order of the Bath
Members of the Privy Council of Ireland
Members of the Parliament of the United Kingdom for English constituencies
UK MPs 1801–1802
UK MPs 1802–1806
UK MPs who were granted peerages
Fellows of the Royal Society
Chief Secretaries for Ireland
Members of the Parliament of Ireland (pre-1801) for County Carlow constituencies
Members of the Parliament of Ireland (pre-1801) for County Fermanagh constituencies
Members of the Parliament of Ireland (pre-1801) for County Louth constituencies
Members of the Parliament of Ireland (pre-1801) for County Cork constituencies
Members of the Parliament of Ireland (pre-1801) for County Down constituencies